Darell is a given name derived from an English surname, which was derived from Norman-French , originally denoting one who came from Airelle in France. There are no longer any towns  in France called Airelle, but  is the French word for huckleberry. Notable people with the name include:

Given name

Arts and entertainment
Darell (rapper), Puerto Rican rapper
Darell Koons (1924–2016), American painter

Politics
Darell baronets, one of two baronetcies created for persons with the surname Darell. Two distinct lines exist, Darell baronets of West Woodhay and Darell baronets of Richmond Hill  
Darell Leiking, also known as Ignatius Dorell Leiking (born 1971), Malaysian politician and government minister
Darell Trelawny or Trelawney (c. 1695–1727), of Coldrenick, near Liskeard, Cornwall, was a British politician who sat in the House of Commons briefly in 1727

Sports
Darell Garretson (1932–2008), American professional basketball NBA referee
Darell Scott (born 1986), a former American football defensive tackle
Darell Tokpa (born 2001), French footballer

Others
Darell Hammond, American philanthropist, founder of the non-profit organization KaBOOM! that helps communities build playgrounds for children

Middle name
George Darell Shee (1843–1894), English judge

Surname

Politics
Sir John Darell, 1st Baronet (d. c. 1657), of the Darell baronets, High Sheriff of Berkshire
John Darell (died 1438), British MP and Sheriff for Kent
John Darell (died 1694), British MP for Maidstone and Rye
Linnéa Darell (born 1945), Swedish politician
William Darell (clergyman) (d. after 1580), English Anglican clergyman and antiquarian
William Darell (British Army officer) (1878–1954), British Army officer

Fictional characters
Arkady Darell, the daughter of Toran Darell II and the granddaughter of Toran and Bayta Darell in the series Foundation

See also 
 Darrell
 Darrel
 Darel
 Darroll
 Daryl
 Darryl
 Durrell
 Derrell

References